The 1981 Embassy World Indoor Bowls Championship  was held at the Coatbridge indoor bowling club, North Lanarkshire, Scotland, from 24 February - 1 March 1981.

David Bryant won his third consecutive title beating Ron Thomas in the final.

Draw and results

Men's singles

Group stages
Group A results

Group B results

Medal round

References

External links
Official website

World Indoor Bowls Championship
1981 in bowls